John Purdue (October 31, 1802 – September 12, 1876) was a wealthy American industrialist in Lafayette, Indiana, and the primary original benefactor of Purdue University.

Early life
Most details of Purdue's early life were either not recorded or lost.

He was born in Huntingdon County, Pennsylvania, to Charles and Mary Short Purdue. He had eight sisters and no brothers. Sometime after 1813 (possibly as late as 1823), the family moved to Ross County, Ohio. During the move, the second oldest daughter, Nancy, died, and shortly after the move, his father died. Shortly thereafter John was apprenticed to an Adelphi merchant, and his mother and at least a few of his sisters moved north and settled near Westerville, Ohio.

Teacher
From 1823 to 1831, he was a school teacher around Ohio and in Michigan.

Businessman
As stated in the 1979 Marion County History Book, on March 13, 1831, he bought a  farm in Salt Rock Township in Marion County, Ohio. He sold the same on August 20, 1832, at a profit. He derived additional gain from collecting a commission in taking his neighbor's hogs to market.

Purdue developed a farm products brokerage that covered the Adelphi, Worthington and Columbus area. In 1833, he and Moses Fowler  opened a general merchandise store in Adelphi. On December 9, 1834, Purdue purchased  of land in Indiana from Jesse Spencer for $850 which he partially paid for in store goods. The land that he bought lies northeast of the intersection of Creasy Lane and McCarty Lane in Lafayette, Indiana.

In 1838 or 1839, Purdue and Fowler liquidated their Ohio holdings and permanently moved to Lafayette. Once there, they opened a dry goods business on the courthouse square. Purdue continued to gain wealth and prestige over the next several years. Most accounts show a man devoted to leading a good civic life, donating time, money, and expertise to various local projects including a bridge over the Wabash River, a railroad from Lafayette to Indianapolis and serving on various boards.

In 1844, Fowler and Purdue ended their association. In 1847, a group of five merchants, including Purdue, completed a  wooden toll bridge across the Wabash.

On October 20, 1852, Purdue and four others were appointed as the first trustees of the new Lafayette City Public School. While various tax-related lawsuits crippled the new statewide public school budget, Purdue and others privately helped keep Lafayette's afloat.

By 1855, Purdue was spending a fair amount of time in New York doing business. In 1856, he became involved in what would come to be Purdue, Ward and Company.

In 1857, he bought stock in and served as a trustee of the Battle Ground Collegiate Institute (college preparatory classes). He also donated $500 in cash to help another collegiate institute in the newly-platted Stockwell, Indiana.

Purdue profited greatly during the American Civil War mainly because of the increase in demand for dry goods by the Union Army. Lafayette supported the Union in the war, but some night-time raids by Confederate sympathizers on local businesses were reported. To protect his assets, Purdue established the "Purdue Rifles," a volunteer protective force of about 100 trained, uniformed and armed men guarding Confederate prisoners, rounded up deserters and maintained order.

Throughout the 1860s, Purdue acquired large tracts of land in nearby Warren County.

In 1867, Purdue invested money in and presided as president of the Lafayette Agricultural Works, a Lafayette implement factory, until the mid-1870s.

In 1868, he contributed money to and was the president for seven years of the new Springvale Cemetery in Lafayette.

In 1869, he helped found the Lafayette Savings Bank.

He later supported some questionable business ventures, including backing the Lafayette, Muncie and Bloomington Railroad, even as lawsuits and debts climbed. Purdue also backed a silver mining scheme in Colorado, the Purdue Gold and Silver Mining and Ore Reduction Company, which failed to pay any dividends.

Politician
In 1864, Purdue lost a contentious primary battle to incumbent Godlove Stein Orth for the nomination of the Union Party's candidate for Congress.

In 1866, Purdue again challenged Orth but this time in the general election as an Independent. Despite buying the Lafayette Journal to counteract the Lafayette Courier (which supported Orth), Purdue was again defeated 14,933 to 14,728.

Purdue University

In 1862, the Morrill Land Grant Act was passed by Congress, and the competition was on to find a location for a land grant college in Indiana. Bidding was fierce between Indiana University in Bloomington, Northwestern Christian in Indianapolis, and the Stockwell and Battle Ground Collegiate Institutes. After the death of influential Lafayette Senator Albert S. White, the Stockwell bid fell through. Years of wrangling failed to reach a compromise. In 1865, the state started the State Normal College (later Indiana State University), partly to relieve some of the pressure. To make Tippecanoe County stand out, various locals stepped up with offers of land and money.

By 1869, Tippecanoe's bid was up to nearly $400,000 in cash, land, and bonds, but the legislature still stalled. Then, Purdue stepped forth with $100,000 of his personal wealth. His only conditions were for the college to be located in Battle Ground and for his surname to be associated with it. The negotiations also allowed the new board of trustees to choose the site of the university and on May 6, 1869, the General Assembly established the institution in Tippecanoe County as Purdue University. Classes began at Purdue on September 16, 1874, with six instructors and 39 students.

Death

He died of an apparent stroke on September 12, 1876, aged 73, on the first day of classes of the third academic year at the university he had helped found. Purdue's grave is located on the university's main campus. A bachelor, he had no heirs so his estate was tied up in litigation for years after his death.

References

Citations

Sources
 Kriebel, Robert C. The Midas of the Wabash: A biography of John Purdue. Purdue University Press, West Lafayette, Indiana, 2002.
 Lafayette Savings Bank
 Scott, Irena McCammon. Uncle: My Journey with John Purdue.  Purdue University Press, West Lafayette, Indiana, 2008.

External links
 John Purdue online exhibit, Purdue University Archives and Special Collections

Purdue University
Businesspeople from Indiana
Philanthropists from Indiana
People from Lafayette, Indiana
People from Ross County, Ohio
People from Huntingdon County, Pennsylvania
1802 births
1876 deaths
19th-century American philanthropists
19th-century American businesspeople